Taekwondo at the 2017 Summer Deaflympics in Samsun, Turkey took place at Atatürk Sports Hall in Canik.'''

Medal summary

Medalists

Poomsae

Men

Women

Mixed

Kyorugi

Men

Women

References

External links
 Taekwondo

2017 Summer Deaflympics
Deaflympics